Tilia johnsoni is an extinct species of flowering plant in the family Malvaceae that, as a member of the genus Tilia, is related to modern lindens (called "limes" in Britain and "basswoods" in the US).  The species is known from fossil leaves found in the early Eocene deposits of northern Washington state, United States and a similar aged formation in British Columbia, Canada.

History and classification
Tilia johnsoni leaf fossils have been identified from two locations in Western North America, the 49 million year old Klondike Mountain Formation near Republic, Washington and at the Quilchena locality near Merritt, British Columbia. Fossil pollen identified as from the genus Tilia has been identified from a greater range of Okanagan Highland fossil sites, having been found in the Allenby Formation near Princeton, British Columbia, at the Falkland fossil site near Falkland, the McAbee Fossil Beds near Kamloops, the Hat Creek Amber and Driftwood Canyon Provincial Park near Smithers.  Of the Okanagan Highlands sites, Tilia microfossils and macrofossils have not been identified from the Horsefly fossil beds near the unincorporated community of Horsefly.

The age for the Okanagan Highland locations is, in general, Early Eocene, with the sites that have current uranium-lead or argon–argon radiometric dates being of Ypresian age, while the undated sites or those given older dates being possibly slightly younger and Lutetian in age.

Tilia johnsoni was described from a single type specimen, a leaf, the holotype being UW 39712, in the paleobotanical collections of Burke Museum, and its counterpart UCMP 9291 in the University of California Museum of Paleontology in California. Working from this specimen, collected in the Republic, Washington area in the early 1980s, the fossil was studied by Jack A. Wolfe of the University of California and Wesley C. Wehr of the Burke Museum.  They published their 1987 type description for the species in a United States Geological Survey monograph on the North Eastern Washington dicot fossils.  The specific epithet johnsoni is a patronym recognizing the help provided to Wolfe and Wehr by a young  Kirk Johnson, now director of the Smithsonian's National Museum of Natural History.  Wolfe and Wehr noted that, at the time of publication, T. johnsoni was the oldest macrofossil occurrence for the genus to be described,; older microfossil records of pollen date near to the Paleocene – Eocene boundary, and fruits of an extinct Tilia relative are known from the Eocene of England.

Description
The type leaf of Tilia johnsoni is palmate in venation with an overall orbicular shape, cordate blade base and acute blade tip.  The central primary vein is flanked by three pairs of lateral primary veins and the margin of the leaf has evenly spaced, distinctly shaped teeth with rounded sinuses separating them. The inner most set of lateral primary veins run parallel to the median secondary veins, broadly curving upwards and with three secondary veins branching off the exterior side.  The branched secondaries run parallel to the next lateral primary vein. The tertiary veins run perpendicular to the secondary veins with an even spacing, while the quaternary veins are orthogonal to the tertiaries forming reticulated pattern of pentagonal and quadrangular spaces.

References

Ypresian plants of North America
Extinct flora of North America
Flora of North America
†
†
Fossil taxa described in 1987
Plants described in 1987
johnsoni
Klondike Mountain Formation